This is a list of airports in Baja California Sur (a Mexican state), grouped by type and sorted by location. It includes public-use, military and private-use airports.



Airports 

Airport names shown in bold indicate the airport has scheduled service on commercial airlines.

See also 
 List of airports in Mexico
 List of airports in Baja California
 List of airports by ICAO code: M#MM - Mexico
 Wikipedia: WikiProject Aviation/Airline destination lists: North America#Mex77ico

External links 
 
  - includes IATA codes
 Great Circle Mapper: Airports in Mexico, reference for airport codes
 Baja Bush Pilot Airports of Mexico Guide

 
Baja California